Phyllonorycter spartocytisi is a moth of the family Gracillariidae. It is known from Spain and the Canary Islands.

The larvae feed on Retama monosperma, Retama recutita and Spartocytisus filipes. They mine the leaves of their host plant. They create a small, upper-surface, tentiform mine. Pupation takes place within the mine.

References

spartocytisi
Moths of Europe
Moths of Africa
Moths described in 1927